The Bankhead–Jones Farm Tenant Act of 1937 (P.L. 75-210) was passed on July 22, 1937 and authorized acquisition by the 
federal government of damaged lands to rehabilitate and use them for various purposes. Most importantly, however, the law authorized a modest credit program to assist tenant farmers to purchase land, and it was the culmination of a long effort to secure legislation for their benefit.

Management of Bankhead-Jones lands
Both the U.S. Forest Service and the Bureau of Land Management manage some Bankhead-Jones lands.  Some Forest Service Bankhead-Jones lands are National Grasslands.

National park
In 1937, the federal government purchased distressed farmland for the Laura S. Walker National Park under a Federal land utilization program authorized by the Bankhead-Jones Farm Tenant Act. The park was named for Waycross, Georgia conservationist Laura S. Walker, in recognition of her work promoting forestry and other civic activities.  Work on the park was undertaken by the Works Progress Administration and the Civilian Conservation Corps. In 1941, the national park was deeded over to Georgia, becoming the State's 13th state park.

First tenant farmer loan repayment
In February 1943, Roddie and Lucile Pridgett of Rankin County, Mississippi, "became the first Negro farm family in the United States to repay their 36-year farm purchase loan to the Farm Security Administration which they obtained under the provisions of the Bankhead-Jones Tenant Purchase Act." They repaid their loan of $1,495 in only five years.

Notes

References 
 Banfield, Edward C. "Ten Years of the Farm Tenant Purchase Program." Journal of Farm Economics 31 (1949): 469-486.
 Bankhead-Jones Farm Tenant Act. U.S. Statutes at Large, 50, Part 1(1937): 522-33.
 
 
 

United States federal agriculture legislation